In software engineering, a distributed design pattern is a design pattern focused on distributed computing problems.

Classification
Distributed design patterns can be divided into several groups:
 Distributed communication patterns
 Security and reliability patterns
 Event driven patterns

Examples
 MapReduce
 Bulk synchronous parallel
 Remote Session

See also
 Software engineering
 List of software engineering topics

References

Software design patterns
Distributed computing architecture